Siegfried Martsch (17 September 1953 – 15 February 2022) was a German politician.

A member of Alliance 90/The Greens, he served in the Landtag of North Rhine-Westphalia from 1990 to 2000. He died on 15 February 2022, at the age of 68.

References

1953 births
2022 deaths
People from Bochum
Alliance 90/The Greens politicians
Politicians from North Rhine-Westphalia
Members of the Landtag of North Rhine-Westphalia